Dragonriders of Pern is a 1984 picture book game published by Nova.

Gameplay
Dragonriders of Pern is a picture-book game similar in design to Ace of Aces, in this case involving numbered full-page illustrations portraying wingmates attempting to burn Thread as in the Dragonriders of Pern novels.

Reception
Lester W. Smith reviewed Dragonriders of Pern in The Space Gamer No. 75. Smith commented that "I found Dragonriders of Pern to be my second-favorite set in the picture-book series, just behind the Handy Rotary planes, and recommend it to anyone, diehard McCaffrey fan or not. At [the price] it may not be a bargain, but it is a good value for the money."

Reviews
Isaac Asimov's Science Fiction Magazine
Asimov's Science Fiction v9 n8 (1985 08)
Jeux & Stratégie #44 (as "Vous Etes Le Maitre du Dragon")

References

Gamebooks
Nova Game Designs games